The Women's 10 m platform competition of the 2022 European Aquatics Championships will be held on 17 August 2022.

Results

The preliminary round was started at 12:00. The final was held at 14:57.

Green denotes finalists

References

Diving